Akademik Karpinsky was a  cargo ship that was built in 1936 as Thalia by Nordseewerke, Emden, Germany for German owners. She was interned at Cadiz, Spain in 1943, and surrendered to the Allies in May 1945. Thalia passed to the Ministry of War Transport (MoWT) and was renamed Empire Consett. In 1946, she was transferred to the Soviet Union and renamed Akademik Karpinsky, serving until 31 August 1953 when she foundered.

Description
The ship was built by Nordseewerke, Emden. She was launched in 1936.

The ship had a GRT of 1,122 and a NRT of 587.

The ship was propelled by a 4-stroke Single Cycle Single Acting diesel engine, which had 12 cylinders of  diameter by  stroke. The engines were built by Friedrich Krupp Germaniawerft AG, Kiel.

History
Thalia was built for Dampfschiffahrts-Gesellschaft Neptun, Bremen. Her port of registry was Bremen and the Code Letters DORT were allocated. When war was declared in 1939, Thalia was at Seville, Spain. She was requisitioned by the Kriegsmarine, In 1943, Thalia was interned at Cadiz, Spain. She was surrendered to the United Kingdom in May 1945.

Thalia was renamed Empire Consett. Her port of registry was changed to London. The Code Letters GSNQ and United Kingdom Official Number 180747 were allocated. Empire Consett was operated under the management of Coast Lines Ltd. It was not until 25 August 1945 that Empire Consett arrived at Falmouth due to problems with her engines on the voyage from Spain. She departed Falmouth under tow on 12 September bound for Cardiff.

In 1946, Empire Consett was allocated to the Soviet Union. She was renamed Akademik Karpinsky. She served until 31 August 1953, when she foundered whilst on a voyage from Kaliningrad to Amsterdam, Netherlands.

in July 2011, the wreck was re-discovered 20 miles north of the port of Władysławowo in Poland in 255 feet (78 Meters) of water.

References

1936 ships
Ships built in Emden
Steamships of Germany
World War II merchant ships of Germany
Ministry of War Transport ships
Empire ships
Steamships of the United Kingdom
Merchant ships of the United Kingdom
Steamships of the Soviet Union
Merchant ships of the Soviet Union
Maritime incidents in 1953